Namyangsan Station is a station on the Busan Metro Line 2 in Mulgeum-eup, Yangsan, South Gyeongsang, South Korea.

External links

  Cyber station information from Busan Transportation Corporation

Metro stations in Yangsan
Railway stations opened in 2008